Robert Hayward may refer to:

 Robert Hayward, Baron Hayward (born 1949), British Conservative politician
 Robert Baldwin Hayward (1829–1903), English educator and mathematician
 Bob Hayward (1927–1961), Canadian powerboat racer

See also
Robert Haywood (disambiguation)